The 1987 Grand Prix de Tennis de Toulouse was a men's tennis tournament played on indoor carpet courts in Toulouse, France that was part of the Regular Series of the 1987 Grand Prix tennis circuit. It was the sixth edition of the tournament and was held from 12 October until 18 October 1987. First-seeded Tim Mayotte won the singles title.

Finals

Singles

 Tim Mayotte defeated  Ricki Osterthun, 6–2, 5–7, 6–4
 It was Mayotte's 3rd singles title of the year and the 5th of his career.

Doubles

 Wojciech Fibak /  Michiel Schapers defeated  Kelly Jones /  Patrik Kühnen, 6–2, 6–4

References

External links
 ITF tournament edition details

Grand Prix de Tennis de Toulouse
Grand Prix de Tennis de Toulouse
Grand Prix de Tennis de Toulouse
Grand Prix de Tennis de Toulouse